Betelnut Beauty is a 2001 Taiwanese film directed by Lin Cheng-sheng.

Cast
 Chang Chen as Feng
 Angelica Lee as Fei-fei
 Leon Dai as Tiger
 Kao Ming-chun as Guang
 Tsai Chen-nan as Ming

Awards
The film premiered in competition at the 51st Berlin International Film Festival. Lin won the Silver Bear for Best Director, and Angelica Lee won the New Talent award.

References

External links
 

2001 films
2000s Mandarin-language films
Films directed by Lin Cheng-sheng
2001 drama films
Taiwanese drama films